William Lean (1941–2015) was a New Zealand Paralympic athlete from Dunedin. In the 1968 Summer Paralympics he competed in archery, athletics, dartchery and table tennis. In the 1976 Summer Paralympics he competed in athletics, table tennis and weightlifting, winning a gold medal in Athletics in the Men's Shot Put 4.

Lean qualified for the 1976 Games earlier in the year at the  Commonwealth Paraplegic Games.  He was one of six members of the team to qualify for Toronto at the event.

Lean would go on to be selected to represent New Zealand for the 1980 Summer Paralympics, but had to miss those Games because of a heart problem.  Having made his debut at the 1968 Games, Lean was his country's seventh ever Paralympian.  When he died in 1976, NZ Paralympics said of him,

Lean had taken up sport following an accident where he fell from a tree as a 19-year-old.  Sports played a key role in his rehabilitation. He made his international debut in 1966. He went to Toronto after having won gold at the 1974 Commonwealth Paraplegic Games in Dunedin, where he set a world record lift of 202.50 kg in the heavyweight class.  He also competed at the 1966 Commonwealth Paraplegic Games in Jamaica.

References

External links
 
 

Archers at the 1968 Summer Paralympics
Athletes (track and field) at the 1968 Summer Paralympics
Dartchers at the 1968 Summer Paralympics
Table tennis players at the 1968 Summer Paralympics
Archers at the 1976 Summer Paralympics
Athletes (track and field) at the 1976 Summer Paralympics
Table tennis players at the 1976 Summer Paralympics
Paralympic gold medalists for New Zealand
1941 births
2015 deaths
Medalists at the 1976 Summer Paralympics
Paralympic medalists in athletics (track and field)
Paralympic athletes of New Zealand
New Zealand male shot putters
Wheelchair shot putters
Paralympic shot putters